Graziella Curreli (born 1960), is a French sculptor working in Haarlem, the Netherlands. She specializes in bronze figures and is known for her sculptures of strong women, most notably Kenau Simonsdochter Hasselaer.

She attended the Sorbonne. She has created works for the city of Haarlem and for the city of Diemen. Her bronze of Kenau and Wigbolt Ripperda for Haarlem was originally designed in a smaller version for the Ripperda renovation project in 2009, but was rejected in favor of a more abstract work. She was then contracted by the Haarlem councilman Chris van Velzen in April 2010 to construct a much larger version, and though he died the same year, the project has been realised and the result is 4 meters high.
Her first sculpture of Kenau was made for the Kenau Hasselaarsprijs, a yearly prize for promoting emancipation.

References

La Vie en Bronze, blog about the 4-year-long project for the Haarlem stationsplein, by Graziella Curreli
Graziella Curreli in the RKD

1960 births
Living people
20th-century French sculptors
21st-century French sculptors
Sculptors from Paris
Artists from Haarlem
20th-century French women artists
21st-century French women artists